A legal conflict among AGB Nielsen Philippines, GMA Network and ABS-CBN in the Philippines for an alleged television ratings breach that occurred in Western Visayan cities of Bacolod and Iloilo, has been ongoing since the last quarter of 2007-2008.

Background

On December 20, 2007, Judge Charito Gonzales, Quezon City Regional Trial Court Br. 80 released a temporary restraining order on TV ratings surveys based on a civil case filed by ABS-CBN versus AGB Nielsen Media Research Philippines. ABS-CBN accused rival GMA Network of funding bribing operations at Bacolod, to discredit the former. The Court further ordered ABS-CBN to file comment on the plea of AGB Nielsen for the alleged gathering and dissemination of television ratings data, within five days or until December 22.

On December 21, 2007, DZMM correspondent Junrie Hidalgo reported a news story titled AGB Nielsen, umamin sa dayaan: GMA Network, tahasang itinurong nasa likod ng dayaan (AGB Nielsen admits the cheating: GMA Network fiercely accused of being responsible of the cheating) during the program Showbiz Mismo, hosted by Cristy Fermin and Jobert Sucaldito. The news story is based on an interview of AGB Nielsen's General Manager Maya Reforma regarding the alleged cheating.

In response, GMA aired a TV plug condemning the alleged biased reporting and denied the accusations of ABS-CBN. They later filed a PHP15-million civil libel suit against ABS-CBN on January 3, 2008. The respondents included Hidalgo, Fermin, Sucaldito, the station manager and news manager of DZMM and hosts, writers and executive producers of TV programs Bandila, Entertainment Live and The Buzz after the same story was aired on the mentioned programs.

On January 7, 2008, the Quezon City RTC junked ABS-CBN's suit against AGB Nielsen, saying the case was "prematurely filed" before the court. Judge Charito Gonzales's basis is the principle of mutuality of contracts, citing Article 1308 and 1196, New Civil Code of the Philippines. Also, Judge Samuel Gaerlan, QCRTC, Branch 92 issued court summons against ABS-CBN and its 15 personnel, in the P15-million damage suit by GMA Network.

On January 17, 2008, Judge Gaerlan recused himself from the case, considering that he has a cousin working in the legal department of ABS-CBN. The case was later re-raffled on January 28, 2008, and the case was eventually assigned to Judge Henri Inting of Branch 95, QCRTC. Judge Inting submitted GMA's petition for a temporary restraining order for decision.

On February 1, ABS-CBN presented two witnesses, Romie Diamanse and Francis Casumpang, saying RGMA head Mike Enriquez was said to have given the order to cheat in a meeting. Enriquez denied the charges and said that the statements were "shameless, malicious fiction delivered by tainted informers with an axe to grind." Diamanse and Casumpang were former employees of RGMA's 93.5 Campus Radio Iloilo (now Barangay FM 93.5 Iloilo). Casumpang resigned from the station after charges of embezzlement, and now works for ABS-CBN's MOR 91.1 Iloilo. On the other hand, RGMA accepted Diamanse's resignation "because he was regarded as ineffective in his duties." Another witnesses, who never revealed their identities for protection, approached the ABS-CBN stations in Davao, Iloilo and Cebu to testify that the alleged employees of GMA were bribing them to watch their programs. A witness from Davao said that they had  watch GMA programs in exchange for grocery items upon discovering that the witness is using an AGB metering panel. At the end of the month, a group of women visit the witness's house to deliver the grocery items such as canned goods. A witness from Iloilo said that they had to watch GMA programs in exchange for receiving half of their electrical expenses. She alleged that the "employees" visit every month to deliver grocery items and present their ID with the logo of GMA. The group also gave some items such as umbrella, plastic cup and towels – all with the GMA logo. The GMA Network denied that they hired the person to visit house-to-house to conduct the alleged rating manipulations.

On February 14, 2008, Judge Inting issued a TRO barring ABS-CBN from airing defamatory statements against GMA.

See also
List of Philippine television ratings for 2008
1972 Martial law under Ferdinand Marcos
Banahaw Broadcasting Corporation
ABS-CBN franchise renewal controversy

References

External links

ABS-CBN
GMA Network
TV5 (Philippine TV network)
2008 in Philippine television
Entertainment scandals
2007 in Philippine television
2008 in Philippine sport
Television controversies in the Philippines